"We Go Up" is a song recorded by South Korean boy band NCT Dream, the youth-oriented unit of the group NCT under the management of SM Entertainment, as the lead single for their third homonymous extended play. It was digitally released by SM Entertainment, with Dreamus as the South Korea distributor, along with its music video on August 30, 2018.

Background and release 
In August, SM Entertainment announced that NCT Dream would release a new EP, We Go Up, on September 3. It was also announced that this would have been Mark's last comeback, due to him graduating from the group in the following December. On August 22, the "timeline" for the comeback was revealed. On August 29, 2018, the teaser for the music video was released.

Composition 
"We Go Up" was written by Kenzie and Mark. The former also participated in the production alongside Andrew Bazzi, MZMC, Michael Woods (Rice N' Peas) and Kevin White (Rice N' Peas). Rice N' Peas also worked on the arrangement. Musically, the song is described as a "retro vibe", hip-hop track with "tinny percussion and booming bass" that "drive the track as the members serve up swaggering raps and harmonious vocals".

Commercial performance 
"We Go Up" debuted at number 73 on the Gaon Digital Chart for the week September 8, 2018, making it the group's highest-charting song to date. It also placed at number 12 on the Download Chart.
The song debuted on the US World Digital Song Sales chart at number 11 and on the K-Pop Hot 100 at number 7.

Music video 
The music video for "We Go Up" focuses heavily on the choreography and shows the group enjoying summer and playing around. Eccentric motifs like bubbles and rocket ships are also included.

Charts

Sales

Release history

References 

2018 songs
2018 singles
NCT Dream songs
NCT (band) songs
SM Entertainment singles
Songs written by Kenzie (songwriter)